Fuchsia corymbiflora is a species of shrub in the family Onagraceae. It is endemic to Peru, and was first introduced to the Royal Botanical Gardens, Kew in 1840.

Etymology
Fuchsia is named for Leonhart Fuchs [1501-66], a renaissance botanist and professor at Tübingen. Corymbiflora means 'with flowers arranged in flat-topped heads (corymbs)'.

References

Flora of Peru
corymbiflora